The Nikkei Asia Prize (Japanese: 日経アジア賞) is an award which recognizes the achievements of people and organizations that have improved the lives of people throughout Asia.  The awards were created and presented by Nikkei Inc, one of the largest media corporations in Japan.

Launched in 1996, the program honors people in Asia who have made significant contributions in one of the three areas: regional growth; science, technology and innovation; and culture.

The category for regional growth (Economic and Business Innovation) is designed to recognize business and economic initiatives that improve living standards and stability in their regions. This could be entrepreneurs who have successfully developed industries and businesses due to innovation.

The category for science, technology and environment was established to recognize scientific researches and technological innovations in various fields.

The category for Culture is designed to recognize people who have made a difference in their countries and Asia through cultural, artistic or educational activities.

Winners

Economic and Business Innovation (formerly Regional Growth)

 1996: Dr. Widjojo Nitisastro
 1997: Dr. Manmohan Singh
 1998: Mr. Ni Runfeng
 1999: Mr. Shi Wen-long
 2000: Dr. Supachai Panitchpakdi
 2001: Mr. N. R. Narayana Murthy
 2002: Dr. Võ Tòng Xuân
 2003: Mr. Lee Hun-jai
 2004: Dr. Muhammad Yunus
 2005: Dr. Morris Chang
 2006: Ms. Olivia Lum
 2007: Mr. Mechai Viravaidya
 2008: Center of Legal Assistance to Pollution Victims in China at China University of Political Science and Law
 2009: Ms. Kiran Mazumdar-Shaw
 2010: Mr. Tony Fernandes
 2011: Mr. Antonio Meloto
 2012: Mr. Yang Yong
 2013: Mr. Truong Gia Binh
 2014: Dr. Devi Prasad Shetty
 2015: Ms. Mai Kieu Lien
 2016: Akshaya Patra Foundation
 2017: Mr. Nandan Nilekani
 2018: Mr. Ma Jun
 2019: Mr. Nadiem Makarim

Science, Technology and Environment

 1996: Prof. Yuan Longping
 1997: Dr. Hyung Sup Choi
 1998: Rubber Research Institute of Malaysia (RRIM)
 1999: Prof. Zhao Qiguo
 2000: Institute of Molecular and Cell Biology (Singapore)
 2001: Dr. Ho-Wang Lee
 2002: Department of Medical Microbiology, Faculty of Medicine, University of Malaya
 2003: Dr. Yang Huanming
 2004: Dr. Yongyuth Yuthavong
 2005: Prof. Ko Myoung Sam
 2006: Mr. Philip Yeo
 2007: Mr. Chang Chun-yen
 2008: Dr. C.N.R. Rao
 2009: Forest Research Institute Malaysia (FRIM)
 2010: Dr. Ding-Shinn Chen
 2011: Dr. Maw-Kuen Wu
 2012: Dr. Chi-Huey Wong
 2013: Mr. Tejraj Aminabhav
 2014: Dr. George F. Gao
 2015: Dr. Wang Yifang
 2016: Dr. Jiang Lei
 2017: Dr. Michael M. C. Lai
 2018: Prof. Nguyen Thanh Liem
 2019: Dr. Liao I-chiu
 2020: Prof. Thalappil Pradeep

Culture and Community

 1996: Dara Kanlaya
 1997: José Maceda
 1998: Kim Jeong Ok
 1999: Dang Nhat Minh
 2000: Dr. Pinyo Suwankiri
 2001: The Nepal Bhasa Dictionary Committee
 2002: Christine Hakim
 2003: Urvashi Butalia
 2004: Albert Wendt
 2005: Guo Dalie
 2006: Sophiline Cheam Shapiro
 2007: Gopal Venu
 2008: Ahn Sung-ki
 2009: Dr. Laretna T. Adishakti
 2010: Manteb Soedharsono
 2011: Bảo Ninh
 2012: Sybil Wettasinghe
 2013: Vann Molyvann
 2014: Mae Fah Luang Foundation
 2015: Asian Youth Orchestra
 2016: Dogmid Sosorbaram
 2017: Edhi Foundation
 2018: Dr. Bindeshwar Pathak
 2019: Cinemalaya Foundation Inc.

See also

 List of awards for contributions to culture
 List of awards for contributions to society

References

External links and sources 
 Nikkei Asia Prize Winners

Asian awards
Awards for contributions to culture
Business and industry awards
Japanese science and technology awards
Nikkei Inc.
Awards established in 1996
1996 establishments in Japan
Awards for contributions to society